The World Hereford Council is the international breeding authority on Hereford cattle, existing for the promotion of breed excellence and the cultivation of global trade in Hereford genetics. Originally based in England, at the Hereford Cattle Society, the Council was established in 1951 as a response to the increasingly widespread international export and breeding of Hereford cattle, and the need to maintain a global authority connecting Hereford cattle to the original English herd book.

The Headquarters of the Council are based in the country of residence of the Secretary General (Uruguay, as of 2015), and move with each new election.

The World Hereford Council aims to advance the mutual interests of pedigree Hereford breeders on a worldwide scale, to act as an international breed authority, and to act as mediator in any disagreements or conflicts that may occur between any of the member countries. Structurally, the Council is led by a Secretary General, voted in by the twenty member countries (each nominating two representatives).

Member Countries
American Hereford Association – United States of America
Asociacion Argentina Criadores de Hereford – Argentina
Herefords Australia Ltd. – Australia
Associação Brasileira de Hereford e Braford – Brazil
Canadian Hereford Association – Canada
Danish Hereford Cattle Society – Denmark
Animal Breeders Association of Estonia – Estonia
Finnish Hereford Society – Finland
German Hereford Association – Germany
Hungarian Hereford Association – Hungary
Irish Hereford Breed Society – Ireland
Republican Chamber of Hereford Breed – Kazakhstan www.herefords.kz
Dutch Hereford Society – Netherlands
New Zealand Hereford Association Inc. – New Zealand
Norway Hereford Association – Norway
South African Hereford Breeders' Society – South Africa
Swedish Hereford Association – Sweden
IG Swiss Hereford – Switzerland
Hereford Cattle Society – United Kingdom
Sociedad Criadores de Hereford del Uruguay – Uruguay

References

External links
The World Hereford Council

International agricultural organizations
1951 establishments in England
Organizations established in 1951
Hereford cattle